Johann Michael Bretschneider (1680–1729) was a German painter.

Life
Bretschneider was born at Aussig, in Bohemia. His parents were Wentzel and Ludmilla Bretschneider.
His teacher is not assuredly known, but it is believed that he learned from Johann Rudolf Byss (1660–1738) in Prague.
On 18 July 1700 he was admitted to the painters' guild in Old Town and got Citizenship on 20 September 1700. He stayed in Prague until 1703. In the years 1717–1721, he can be detected in Vienna, where he painted genre pictures and flowers, then he probably came to Bavaria.
Pictures of him are displayed in the Pinakothek in Munich (p.e. Musical Entertainment) and in the Germanisches Nationalmuseum in Nuremberg (p.e. Picture Gallery).

References

Sources

External links 

 Picture Discussion
 Czech artist Encyclopedia

1680 births
1729 deaths
18th-century German painters
18th-century German male artists
German male painters
Artists from Ústí nad Labem